"I Want You" is a song recorded by American singer Janet Jackson for her eighth studio album, Damita Jo (2004). It was released on February 22, 2004 as the second single from the album, by Virgin Records. It was written by Harold Lilly, Kanye West, and John Legend, while it was produced by West, Jimmy Jam & Terry Lewis, and Jackson. The mid-tempo ballad consists of a retro sound and arrangement, paying homage to the classic pop sound of the Motown era. Its composition is based on Jackson's passion and desire for an estranged lover. "I Want You" is notable for being among the first singles produced with West and co-written by Legend, who were both upcoming artists at the time.

The song received positive reviews by music critics, who complimented Jackson's vocals and its fusion of nostalgic and modern qualities. The song's performance was largely affected by the blacklisting of Jackson's singles and music videos worldwide due to U.S. Federal Communications Commission fines regarding her controversial Super Bowl Halftime Show incident, with conglomerates such as Viacom and CBS enforcing the boycott. "I Want You" reached the top 20 in airplay prior to stalling due to the blockage, also becoming Jackson's 33rd consecutive top-40 hit on the Hot R&B/Hip-Hop Songs chart. The blacklisting drew controversy amongst critics, who declared the song to likely have been an "across-the-board smash" hit had the incident not occurred.

"I Want You" was certified platinum by the Recording Industry Association of America (RIAA) and received a nomination for Best Female R&B Vocal Performance at the 47th Annual Grammy Awards. The song's music video was directed by Dave Meyers and portrays Jackson traveling through Los Angeles to meet her boyfriend. It did not air on MTV nor several other music channels owned by Viacom and CBS due to their boycott of Jackson following her Super Bowl performance incident. During the promotional campaign for Damita Jo, Jackson performed "I Want You" on various occasions, including on Good Morning America.

Background
"I Want You" was written by Harold Lilly, Kanye West, and John Legend, while production was handled by West, Jimmy Jam & Terry Lewis, and Jackson. It was initially titled "Have Your Way with Me" in its early stages, and was one of two songs from the album which Jackson did not co-write, along with "Thinkin' 'Bout My Ex", written by Kenneth "Babyface" Edmonds. Describing the song, Jackson said, "It's a different kind of song for me, it's more of like a throwback. More of a doowoop-y [feel], which I've never done before which is quite exciting, and I enjoyed recording it in the studio." John Platt, senior Vice President of Virgin Records and EMI Publishing, commented that Damita Jo "is really about positive love and where she's at in her life right now. The second half of the album was very easy once me and Janet got to know each other, and found the songs that really were true to her and that she can sing with conviction. That's why there's so much passion in this "I Want You" record, that's where she's at in her life right now."

West first collaborated with Jackson several months prior to the release of his debut album, The College Dropout (2004). West stated, "I don't want to talk about it before it comes out, but it'll be unbelievable." John Legend, who co-wrote the track, also plays the piano on the track. Legend was an upcoming artist and relatively unknown at the time, having not yet released his debut album Get Lifted or any singles. The song was among Legend's first major credits along with the West-produced Jay-Z single "Encore", West's remix of Britney Spears' "Me Against the Music", and The Black Eyed Peas' "The Boogie that Be." Legend commented, "I'm not going to focus on her breast like the rest of y'all. I'm about the music. Since everyone's paying attention to her, it should bode well for her next single "Have Your Way With Me" which is gonna drop next week. We're just wrapping up the production now. It's produced by Kanye West and co-written by Kanye, Harold Lilly and yours truly. I played some piano on there too. It's a sweet, soulful song. I think it'll be a smash." The song also features contributions from Israeli violinist Miri Ben-Ari. Simon Umlauf of CNN commented Ari's contribution "gently caresses" the song, providing "a dramatic edge you won't find anywhere else."

Release
Due to an early leak, "I Want You" was released for digital download through Virgin Records's website and All Access Music Group on February 22, 2004, though it was not officially sent to radio until March 1, 2004. "Love Me", a newly recorded remix of "Just a Little While" produced by Just Blaze, was initially to be sent to urban radio formats. However, its release was canceled when the original version was removed from airplay due to blacklisting from several conglomerates regarding Jackson's Super Bowl performance incident, prompting the release of "I Want You". The album version concludes with a brief interlude of Jackson speaking of her passion for music, which the radio edit omits. A promotional single including the song's E-Smoove remix, music video, and exclusive interview was released for purchase at Regal Cinemas for a limited time.

Composition

"I Want You" is a pop ballad based on music of the Motown era. It incorporates doo-wop, R&B and hip-hop into its production, providing an "equally keen senses of retroism and hip-hop currency." Its instrumentation consists of guitar, piano, violins, and synthesized drums. It has a slow tempo of 72 beats per minute, with Jackson's vocals ranging from G3 to C5. It contains a brief sample from B. T. Express' 1976 version of The Carpenters' 1970 song "(They Long to Be) Close to You", written by Burt Bacharach and Hal David. Jackson described the song as having a "throwback" feel, considered a departure from her other works. Michael Paletta of Billboard described its "opening drum downbeat" accompanied by "swirling string crescendos," considered "the perfect backdrop for Jackson's breathy vocals." It was analyzed to have a "chimes-studded texture" and strings backed by drums, also having "a triangle thrown in there for good measure." Its lyrics focus on longing for an estranged lover and feeling emotionally distraught when apart. Jackson pleads for their affection during its chorus, telling them to "Have your way with me." Tareck Ghoneim of Contactmusic.com stated "The lyrics are simple. She just wants her man and she’s telling it straight," while Plugged In observed it to convey Jackson's "insatiable" desire for intimacy in a "vulnerable and lovesick" manner.

Critical reception
"I Want You" received favorable reviews from music critics. Michael Paoletta of Billboard stated, "the retro-vibed song calls to mind the sparkly yet wistful soul of '60s-era girl groups" while maintaining "a contemporary reference". Paoletta considered its aura and "girl-desires-boy theme" to make the track a "crossover gem". West's production was also praised, adding "the opening drum downbeat immediately sets the tone. That beat smoothly propels the song, accompanied by swirling string crescendos that are the perfect backdrop for Jackson's breathy vocals", concluding it to potentially have "multiformat popularity." Ernest Hardy of LA Weekly called it "a retro affair" with a classic "girl-group arrangement", while a critique from Gashaus noted the song "shimmers with some of Janet's former iridescent glow." Alexis Petridis of The Guardian praised its "impossibly lithe basseline", calling it an electronic reconstruction of a 1970s soul ballad, also determined to be "not only inventive, but brilliantly constructed."

Hot Press called it an "obligatory ballad" which portrays Jackon's musicality, showcasing her "versatility and mastery of a bewildering array of styles." Spence D. of IGN praised the single, calling it "'70s retro mode" and a perfect homage to the era of mainstream excess. The review added, "It's squeaky and clean sounding in a sugary, fluff kind of way, almost as if it were a song recorded by Janet years ago and recently rediscovered. And you know what? It's cool because of that." Aaron Foley of MLive considered it Jackson's fourth most underrated single, calling it among "the fruits from that era that don't get the respect they deserve". Foley added, that after Jackson's Super Bowl XXXVIII halftime show controversy, "I Want You" "got lost in the wash. The starry-eyed, Motown-inspired ballad had Janet vulnerable and lovesick, boo hooing for her lover's attention."

Jim Abott of Orlando Sentinel classified "the sweetly melodic old-school" song among Jackson's "occasional bursts of inspiration," declaring it "a beautifully big arrangement that's Motown-esque." Additionally, its "depth and sweetness" was considered unexpected by Dan LeRoy from The Scene, commenting "West's swaying '50s pastiche "I Want You" is delightful". Richard Cromelin of the Los Angeles Times exclaimed the track "has a swooning charm, with a chimes-studded texture that suggests the sweeping light-points of a disco ball." Mikael Wood of Baltimore City Paper gave a similar critique, saying the "luscious slow jam" ultimately "shimmers with the sweet lovesickness Karen Carpenter had to fight through a scrim of suburban sang-froid to express." Stephen Thomas Erlewine of AllMusic declared the song "on the slower side", containing "a verse that's memorable." Plugged In observed subtle sexuality within its lyrics, commenting that Jackson is insatiable. The song's production from West also received acclaim. Music critic Kevin Nottingham ranked it as West's second best production, classifying it as a "gorgeous piece of work." He exclaimed. "The drums hit at the beginning and the listener should already fall in love. Janet's voice should intrigue you, but frankly, those strings and those drums grab my attention all the time." Nottingham added that West's beat takes the listener on a joyful ride, while the beat evokes happiness.

Chart performance
The song was released exclusively in North America and Europe to urban radio formats. Due to the blacklist, "I Want You" quickly rose to number eighteen in airplay before stalling on the chart. The song generated an audience impression of nearly twenty-two million on formats able to play the song during its first week. The song debuted at number 74 on the Billboard Hot 100 on April 3, 2004, before peaking at number 57 weeks later. It also peaked at number 18 on Hot R&B/Hip-Hop Songs, becoming her thirty-third consecutive top forty hit on the chart. It had also reached number sixteen on Radio and Recordss weekly airplay report. Additionally, it also peaked at number four on Billboards Urban Adult Contemporary airplay chart. Due to strong sales, the song was certified platinum by the Recording Industry Association of America (RIAA).

"All Nite (Don't Stop)" was released as the album's second single in most international markets as a double A-Side with "I Want You", making the song ineligible to chart. However, "I Want You" reached number 19 in the United Kingdom. It also reached number ten on the United Kingdom's BBC Radio 2 airplay chart, while lead single "Just a Little While" spent multiple weeks atop the chart. It received a Grammy nomination for Best Female R&B Vocal Performance at the 47th Annual Grammy Awards.

Blacklist

"I Want You", along with Jackson's other singles from Damita Jo and her following two albums, was blacklisted by many major radio formats following her controversial Super Bowl Halftime Show incident that resulted in several media conglomerates receiving massive U.S. Federal Communications Commission fines in its aftermath, such as Viacom, which owns many radio formats, MTV, and CBS, which broadcast the event and owns Clear Channel Communications. The blacklisting of Jackson drew attention and commentary from music critics, with many claiming the song would likely have achieved greater success if the blockage had not occurred. Glenn Gamboa of Newsweek stated, "Unfortunately, it's not clear whether these songs will get heard," saying after the incident, "Jackson has been put in the pop culture penalty box. The result is that despite some initial backing for "Just a Little While", radio and TV support for her music has withered, as the conglomerates worry about angering the FCC and Congress" in fear of receiving fines for supporting Jackson. Gamboa added that "I Want You" would have been an "across-the-board smash pre-Nipplegate." In retrospect, Rich Juzwiak of Gawker commented that the "lush" single would have been successful for Jackson given a different set of circumstances.

Music video

Background and synopsis

The music video for "I Want You" was directed by Dave Meyers, who previously directed Jackson's music videos for "All for You" and "Just a Little While". It debuted on March 16, 2004, on BET's Access Granted. Intended to resemble Brooklyn, New York, the video was shot in Los Angeles. It portrays Jackson traveling through the city at night to meet her boyfriend, interacting with the various people she encounters along the way. Jackson commented that the video was simple, and there was not a major production for wardrobe, hair and makeup. Explaining its concept, she stated "I'm coming out of my apartment building and walking down the street, and you see all the goings-on in the neighborhood." Jackson praised Meyers as a director, saying "I think he's a wonderful director and he's a good friend, we've been friends since the "All for You" video. He has a great eye." Hollywood casting agents sought a wide variety of extras, ranging from teenage delinquents to mothers picking up her babies and children from day care, and other people commuting by bus to and from work. The video was desired to have an intimate "community" feel. Meyers stated:

"The song has kind of an old school vibe to it, so we wanted to be really stripped down and really simple with the video. Every time we get the chance to work together I always try to do something a little different, you know. I hadn't seen her a do a real stripped down, really basic video. I got a taste of it when I did another video with her where she was a guest star, and I got her really stripped down in that but it was still in a Jamaican environment. I just wanted to put her in a really contemporary American environment and bring out the emotions in the song and the bittersweetness of it. Me and her were just vibing off that, and thought it would be really fun to do something just really simple. No visual effects, no gags. The whole strength of the video is on just the honesty of the piece, and that was sort of what we set out to do. Sometimes it's an important visual effect, today it's an important emotion."

A portion of the clip's premise was inspired by Jackson's then-relationship with record producer Jermaine Dupri, which was unconfirmed and had generated speculation within the media. Meyers explained, "In the other video we were shooting, she came out of the trailer wearing a So So Def jacket, and that's when I got the idea, 'it would be great if you do a whole video if you look like you do now when you're going home'. It took her a minute, she thought about it, she asked JD if he'd be okay with doing the video, 'cus I was begging and I was like, 'if I could get the two of you in a simple video together, it's gonna be gold.' She asked and he said yea, and that's when my video came to life." Meyers also had the idea for Dupri's cameo due to persistent rumors of their relationship circulating in the media, saying "That's the whole concept here, a real simple video and then the slam dunk is JD's in the video. He hasn't been in any of her stuff and all the rumors of 'are they together, are they not together.'"

The video begins with Jackson leaving her apartment before walking through the city's various settings, including a grocery store before taking the bus, and ends with Jackson entering a Boys & Girls Club recreation center to visit her then-boyfriend, record producer Jermaine Dupri. Along with Dupri, actor Bobb'e J. Thompson makes a brief cameo. Jackson is shown wearing her trademark midriff-baring outfits and navel piercing in the clip. A scene of Jackson purchasing Trojan condoms was filmed to promote safe sex, but was omitted from the final video. Jackson previously included a similar message at the finale of her video for "Any Time, Any Place" (1994).

Reception and blacklist
The video generally received positive reception, although Dupri's cameo was ultimately panned. A review considered the portrayal of Jackson "walking down some really shady parts of the neighbourhood in pursuit of Jermaine Dupri" as unrealistic. In an interview with Launch.com, Jackson said she was not hesitant to feature Dupri in the video, although revealed it was the director's idea to do so.

Following her highly controversial Super Bowl incident, Jackson's singles and music videos were blacklisted by various entertainment conglomerates involved with the event who received massive FCC fines, including Viacom, which owns MTV, VH1, and co-produced the event, and CBS, which aired the event and owns Clear Channel Communications. A senior executive for Viacom stated, "[We are] absolutely bailing on the record. The pressure is so great, they can't align with anything related to Janet. The high-ups are still pissed at her, and this is a punitive measure." As a result, the video for "I Want You", in addition to other releases from Damita Jo and Jackson's following two albums, received minimal or no rotation on major music channels, despite Jackson's appeal and iconic status in pop culture. In British publication Music Week, Virgin Record's marketing director Elizabeth Nordy stated MTV's lack of support due to the Super Bowl incident had been a "major catalyst" in the performance of Jackson's singles. Jam also responded to an MTV statement claiming the network never received Jackson's videos, pointing out that both BET and VH1 received it.

Live performances
During promotional campaign for Damita Jo, Jackson performed "I Want You" on Good Morning America, On Air with Ryan Seacrest, Much Music, Canada AM, and Spain's Gala Xacobeo. Additionally, the performances from On Air with Ryan Seacrest and Much Music are included on Jackson's From Janet to Damita Jo: The Videos compilation.

Track listings
"I Want You" was released as a double A-side with "All Nite (Don't Stop)".UK CD single"All Nite (Don't Stop)" – 3:26
"I Want You" – 3.58
"Put Your Hands On" – 3:56
"All Nite (Don't Stop)" (Sander Kleinenberg Radio Mix) – 4:14
"I Want You" (Ray Roc Radio Mix) – 4:18
"All Nite (Don't Stop)" (Video)
"I Want You" (Video)European CD single"All Nite (Don't Stop)" – 3:26
"I Want You" – 4:12UK promotional CD single"I Want You" (Radio Edit) – 3:54
"I Want You" (Main Version) – 4:01Spanish promotional CD single"I Want You" (Radio Edit) – 3:50Taiwanese promotional CD single"I Want You" – 4:12
"Just a Little While" (UK Mix) – 4:05US promotional mini CD single"I Want You" (E-Smoove Remix) – 4:15
"I Want You" (Video) – 3:45UK promotional CD-R"I Want You" (E-Smoove Remix Main Edit) – 4:16
"I Want You" (E-Smoove Remix Main Dub) – 7:10
"I Want You" (E-Smoove Remix Main Instrumental) – 7:37
"I Want You" (E-Smoove Remix Main Edit) – 4:16
"I Want You" (E-Smoove Hard Mix) – 7:42
"I Want You" (E-Smoove Remix Hard Dub) – 7:43
"I Want You" (E-Smoove Remix Soul Dub) – 7:27 
"I Want You" (Ray Roc Project Club Mix) – 8:18
"I Want You" (Ray Roc Project Deep Mix) – 8:02
"I Want You" (Ray Roc Project Dub Mix) – 7:46
"I Want You" (Ray Roc Project Radio Mix) – 4:19
"I Want You" (Ray Roc Project Radio Instrumental) – 4:18
"I Want You" (Radio Edit) – 3:50
"I Want You" (Album Version) – 3:59Jamaican promotional 7" single'''
"I Want You (More)" (Federation Remix featuring Vybz Kartel) – 3:50
"I Want You (More)" (Federation Remix - No Rap)

Credits and personnel
Janet Jackson – vocals, producer
Kanye West – songwriter, producer
James Harris III - producer, keyboards
Terry Lewis - producer
John Legend - songwriter
Harold Lilly - songwriter
Miri Ben-Ari – violin
Burt Bacharach – songwriter
Hal David - songwriter
Bobby Ross Avila - guitarist
Keenan Holloway - bassist
Ervin Pope - keyboards
Ian Cross - engineer
Tats Sato - engineer

Credits and personnel adapted from Damita Jo'' album liner notes.

Charts

Weekly charts

Year-end charts

Certifications

|}

Release history

References

2000s ballads
2004 singles
2004 songs
Janet Jackson songs
Music videos directed by Dave Meyers (director)
Pop ballads
Contemporary R&B ballads
Song recordings produced by Jimmy Jam and Terry Lewis
Song recordings produced by Kanye West
Songs with lyrics by Hal David
Songs with music by Burt Bacharach
Songs written by Harold Lilly (songwriter)
Songs written by John Legend
Songs written by Kanye West
Virgin Records singles
Doo-wop songs